Death Valley is a desert valley in southeastern California in the Mojave Desert.

Death Valley may also refer to:

Places
Death Valley National Park, a national park in the U.S. states of California and Nevada
Places nicknamed "Death Valley"
Interstate 40 in North Carolina, a section of Interstate 40 in Greensboro, North Carolina
Link Valley, Houston, a community in Houston, Texas

Arts, entertainment, and media

Films
 Death Valley, 1927 film directed by Paul Powell
 Death Valley (1946 film), starring Robert Lowery
 Death Valley (1982 film), starring Paul Le Mat

Music
 Death Valley Suite (1949), a symphonic suite by Ferde Grofe, inspired by the history and geography of Death Valley

Television
Death Valley (TV series), a 2011 MTV horror comedy series
Death Valley Days (1930-1945 radio series; 1952–1970 TV series), an American radio and television anthology series featuring true stories of the old American West, particularly the Death Valley area

Structures nicknamed "Death Valley"
Memorial Stadium (Clemson), Clemson, South Carolina
Tiger Stadium (LSU), Baton Rouge, Louisiana
Yankee Stadium (1923), left-center field of the former stadium in the Bronx, New York City, which was 399 feet from home plate and was difficult to hit a home run over

See also

Valley of Death (disambiguation)

Долина Смерти